Nordland Teater is a Norwegian theatre based in Mo i Rana. It was established in 1977 by Norwegian Parliament as the regional theatre for Nordland. Birgitte Strid has been theatre director since 2013.

Theatre directors
1979–1986 Collective leadership
1987 Three-man-committee (Geir Næss, Stig Bang, Bodvar Moe)
1988–1990 Wolfgang Kolneder
1991 Bjørn Skjefstad
1992 Torbjørn Gabrielsen
1993–1996 Thom Bastholm
1997–2000 Frode Rasmussen
2001–2007 Thor Inge Gullvåg
2008–2012 Reidar Sørensen
2013– Birgitte Strid

References

Rana, Norway
Theatres in Norway
Buildings and structures in Nordland
Culture in Nordland